Perittopus breddini is a species of Riffle bug from Indonesia.

Veliidae
Insects described in 1901
Insects of Indonesia